Yuanjia may refer to:

Locations
Yuanjia, Jiahe (袁家镇), a town in Jiahe County, Hunan
 Yuanjia, Zhongfang (袁家镇),  a township of Zhongfang County, Hunan

Historical eras
Yuanjia (151–153), era name used by Emperor Huan of Han
Yuanjia (424–453), era name used by Liu Yilong, emperor of Liu Song

See also
Chongming Island#History